Jugulospora is a genus of fungi that was placed within the Lasiosphaeriaceae family, It was then moved into the Neoschizotheciaceae family. This was thought to be a monotypic genus, containing the single species Jugulospora rotula, until more species were found.

Species
As accepted by Species Fungorum;
Jugulospora antarctica 
Jugulospora carbonaria 
Jugulospora minor 
Jugulospora rotula 
Jugulospora vestita

References

Sordariomycetes genera